Nealy is a surname that may refer to:

Barrick Nealy (born 1983), American and Canadian football quarterback
Ed Nealy (born 1960), American basketball player
Frances E. Nealy (1918–1997), American actress and dancer

First name:
Nealy Phelps

See also
Neely
Neeley